Lapasari Village is near Rajkot city in Rajkot district in Gujarat State in India.

Lapasari (Rotary Mid Town Check Dam)
This is a small check dam constructed on river Bhakharwadi near village Lapasari 8 km away from Rajkot city. About 50 McFt water from this Check Dam will be diverted to Aji river in every monsoon. This dam is constructed with a financial-aid from "Rotary International Club".

Villages in Rajkot district